Vello Kaaristo (before 1936 Vassili Krassikov; 17 March 1911 in Narva – 14 August 1965) was the first Estonian cross-country skier to compete in the Olympics. At the 1936 Winter Olympics in Garmisch-Partenkirchen he placed 30th in the 18 km event with the time of 1'25:11, and 23rd in the 50 km event with the time of 4'02:52.

External links
Vello Kaaristo's profile at Sports Reference

1911 births
1965 deaths
Estonian male cross-country skiers
Olympic cross-country skiers of Estonia
Cross-country skiers at the 1936 Winter Olympics
Sportspeople from Narva
20th-century Estonian people